Conor Ciaran Masterson (born 8 September 1998) is an Irish footballer who plays as a centre back for Gillingham, on loan from Queens Park Rangers.

Club career
Originally from Celbridge, County Kildare, in Ireland, he played for Lucan United before making a move to Liverpool on his 16th birthday.

He made his U18s debut in 2014–15. A Republic of Ireland youth international, Masterson captained the under-18s and was an unused sub for Liverpool in their FA Cup tie at Exeter City in January 2016.  He moved to the U23s squad ahead of the 2017–18 season.

He was named on the bench for Liverpool's UEFA Champions League 3–0 quarter final victory against Manchester City on 4 April 2018. He was named in Liverpool's Premier League squad for the match against Everton on 7 April 2018 and was included on the substitutes' bench.

Masterson was released by Liverpool at the end of the 2018–19 season.

Queens Park Rangers
On 3 July 2019, Masterson signed a two-year deal with Queens Park Rangers. On 5 January 2020, he made his debut for the club in an FA Cup third round 5–1 defeat of Swansea City. On 18 July 2020, Masterson scored his first senior goal when he opened the scoring in an eventual 4–3 victory over Millwall.

Swindon Town (loan)
On 19 January 2021, Masterson joined League One side Swindon Town on loan until the end of the 2020-21 season

Cambridge United (loan)
On 21 August 2021, Masterson joined League One side Cambridge United on loan until January 2022. Masterson was named in the starting line-up on the same day as the U's faced Burton Albion. On 4 January 2022, Masterson returned to QPR.

Gillingham (loans)
On 28 January 2022, Masterson joined EFL League One side Gillingham on loan until 30 April 2022.

Masterson again joined Gillingham on loan in January 2023.

Career statistics

References

External links
  Football Association Ireland profile

1998 births
Living people
Republic of Ireland association footballers
Republic of Ireland youth international footballers
Association footballers from Dublin (city)
Association football central defenders
Liverpool F.C. players
Queens Park Rangers F.C. players
Swindon Town F.C. players
Cambridge United F.C. players
Gillingham F.C. players
English Football League players
Republic of Ireland expatriate association footballers